Kansas City 6 is a 1981 studio album by Count Basie.

Track listing
"Opus Six" (Count Basie) – 6:29
"Vegas Drag" – 6:14
"Scooter" – 4:36
"Wee Baby Blues" (Pete Johnson, Big Joe Turner) – 5:33
"Blues for Little Jazz" – 4:58
"St. Louis Blues" (W. C. Handy) – 4:59
"Walking the Blues" (Champion Jack Dupree, Teddy McRae) – 4:48
"N.H.O.P." – 7:05

Personnel
 Count Basie - piano
 Eddie Vinson - alto saxophone
 Willie Cook - trumpet
 Joe Pass - guitar
 Niels-Henning Ørsted Pedersen - double bass
 Louie Bellson - drums

References

1981 albums
Count Basie albums
Pablo Records albums
Albums produced by Norman Granz